HRS may refer to:

 Copenhagen Hospitality College
 Croatian Amateur Radio Association
 Croatian Handball Federation
 Head-Royce School, in Oakland, California
 Health and Retirement Study, a research study into ageing in the United States
 Heart Rhythm Society, an international educational organization
 Helena Romanes School, in Essex, England
 Hepatorenal syndrome
 Historical Records Survey, a New Deal project in the United States
 Historical Social Research, an academic journal 
 Hot Record Society
 House Rabbit Society, an American animal rescue
 HRS antenna, a radio antenna
 Human Rights Service, a Norwegian think tank
 Hydraulics Research Station, UK
 Sikorsky HRS, a helicopter

See also 
 HR (disambiguation)
 Hours (disambiguation)